The Washington Metro (commonly called Metro, and branded Metrorail) is a rapid transit system serving Washington, D.C. and neighboring communities in Maryland and Virginia, both inside and outside the Capital Beltway. With an average weekday ridership of 764,300, the Washington Metro is the second-busiest rapid transit system in the United States, behind the New York City Subway. An additional infill station at Potomac Yard is planned to open in May 2023 on the Yellow and Blue lines.

The Washington Metro system was conceived as an alternative to the construction of a large freeway system throughout the Washington, D.C. area and was partially financed with funds originally dedicated to highway construction. Construction began in 1969, and in 1976 the first section of the Metro system opened along the Red Line between the Rhode Island Avenue and Farragut North stations in Washington, D.C. Throughout the 1970s and 1980s, more stations were opened in the city and the suburban communities of Arlington County, the City of Alexandria, and Fairfax County in Virginia as well as Montgomery and Prince George's Counties in Maryland. By 1991, five rail lines were open: the Red, Blue, Green, Orange, and Yellow Lines. The system as originally planned was completed in 2001 with the extension of the Green Line to Branch Avenue. In 2004, three stations were opened: an extension of the Blue Line to the Downtown Largo and Morgan Boulevard stations and the first infill station, NoMa–Gallaudet U. The Silver Line opened in two phases, adding five stations in 2014 and six in 2022.

Nine Metrorail stations are officially designated transfer stations, although other intermediate stations also allow passengers to transfer between lines. Four of those stations have separate, perpendicular upper and lower levels which opened at different times. Two other transfer stations, Rosslyn and Pentagon, have parallel stacked platforms. Ten stations are termini (stations at the end of lines); several other non-terminus stations are used to short turn trains in regular service.

, Union Station was the busiest station in the system, with an average of 28,864 passenger boardings per weekday. Nine of the top ten busiest stations are in the District of Columbia. Metro Center, a transfer point for the Blue, Orange, Silver, and Red Lines, is the busiest transfer station, with 24,160 boardings. Shady Grove in suburban Montgomery County, Maryland was the busiest terminus with 11,696 passenger boardings per weekday.

Lines
There are six Washington Metro lines, each named for a different color. All lines except the Red Line share tracks.

Stations

Future stations

Potomac Yard, planned to open in May 2023, is an infill station between Braddock Road and National Airport on the Yellow and Blue lines.

Notes
  Stations noted in this list twice with upper and lower levels are considered by WMATA to be a single station. The levels are noted separately here because they opened on different dates.

References

Washington
Washington D.C. Metro